Boisseau is a French surname. Notable people with the surname include:

Alfred Boisseau (1823–1901), Canadian artist
Damien Boisseau, French voice actor
Jocelyne Boisseau (born 1953), French actress
Juanita Boisseau (1911-2012), American dancer
Michelle Boisseau (1955–2017), American poet
Nicolas-Gaspard Boisseau (1765–1842), Canadian politician

French-language surnames